Acrocercops glutella is a moth of the family Gracillariidae, known from Java, Indonesia. It was described by W. van Deventer in 1904. th hostplants for the species include Gluta rengus and Semecarpus heterophylla.

References

glutella
Moths of Asia
Moths described in 1904